The DSR-570 is a digital format camcorder manufactured by Sony in Japan. It is based on the DVCAM format developed by Sony. It utilizes three 2/3 inch CCDs which are natively in the 16:9 format. The large CCDs achieve a 570,000 pixel density and over 800 TV lines in 16:9 mode (It can also achieve 850 TV lines if set to 4:3 mode). Due to the CCDs Hyper Gain option they are extremely sensitive in less than favorable lighting situations; that may be as dim as 0.25 lx. 
The DSR-570 is intrinsically different from most camcorders because of its hybrid capabilities. The camcorder, along with several other cameras in its family line, contain the 26-pin CCU port. This is unorthodox when compared with its successors and peers. In most cases a studio camera equipped with TRIAX or a CCU would not contain a VTR, but the DSR-570 did.  A camcorder, which typically would contain a VTR, would not contain the ports traditionally associated with studio cameras.  The DSR-570 married the two together in one package. Due to its flexibility, the DSR-570 has widely been used for local news stations both in the US and in Europe.

References

External links 
 

DSR-570
DSR-570